Ramus of spinal nerve may refer to:

 Anterior ramus of spinal nerve
 Posterior ramus of spinal nerve